13th Battalion may refer to:

 13th Battalion (Australia), a unit of the Australian Army
 13th Battalion (Royal Highlanders of Canada), CEF, a unit of the Canadian Army
 13th "Shavnabada" Light Infantry Battalion, a unit of the Georgian Army
 13th Airmobile Battalion (Ukraine), a unit of the Ukrainian Army
 13th Psychological Operations Battalion, a unit of the United States Army
 Combat Logistics Battalion 13, a unit of the United States Marine Corps

See also

 13th Army (Soviet Union)
 13th Division (disambiguation)
 13th Brigade (disambiguation)
 13th Regiment (disambiguation)
 13th Squadron (disambiguation)